The 51st Guillermo Mendoza Memorial Scholarship Foundation Box Office Entertainment Awards (GMMSF-BOEA) was an awarding ceremony honoring the actors, actresses, showbiz personalities, movies and TV programs in the Philippines. It was originally scheduled to take place at the Resorts World Manila, on March 15, 2020. However, because of the COVID-19 pandemic in the Philippines, it was rescheduled to October 18, 2020, having been taped before its telecast on new network TV5. Originally going to be aired on ABS-CBN, it was moved to TV5 due to the aforementioned network's free to air shutdown.

Winners selection
The GMMSF honors Filipino actors, actresses and other performers' commercial success, regardless of artistic merit, in the Philippine entertainment industry. The award giving body selects the high-ranking Philippine films for the calendar year 2019 based on total average rankings at box office published results as basis for awarding the three major categories in the awarding ceremonies, The Phenomenal Box Office Star, The Box Office King and The Box Office Queen.

Winners

Film

Television

Music

Other Awards

Special Awards

References

Box Office Entertainment Awards
2020 film awards
2020 television awards
2020 music awards
Music events postponed due to the COVID-19 pandemic